Herbert Pullinger (1878–1961) was an American illustrator, a painter and printmaker who taught at Philadelphia Museum School of Industrial Art from 1923 to 1958.

References
The Philadelphia Print Shop, Ltd.
Pennsylvania Academy of the Fine Arts

1878 births
1961 deaths
American illustrators
Painters from Pennsylvania
University of the Arts (Philadelphia) faculty
20th-century American painters
American male painters
20th-century American printmakers
Pennsylvania Impressionism
20th-century American male artists